Robinson Ekspeditionen 2017 was the nineteenth season of the Danish version of Swedish television series Expedition Robinson. The season premiered on August 28, 2017. The main twist this season is that the two tribes are divided based by age. The North Team consisting of the oldest contestants, and the South Team consists of the youngest. In addition, the East Team consists of five former Robinson contestants who return for a second chance to have a chance to become this year's Robinson unbeknownst to the others. A returning feature this season is the duel. However, in this season, the winner of the duel has their tribe exempt from participating in the immunity challenge and therefore, safe from tribal council. The loser of the duel is sent home and has to have their tribe compete in the immunity challenge against the tribe that finished second.

Finishing order

Season summary

Voting history

 As Hentze came last in the opening challenge she was penalized with an automatic vote at the first tribal council.

 As Andreas, Backer and Mathias were caught asking for food from fishermen at a village the contestants had filmed near earlier they were told they would be punished. Their punishment was that they had voided their team's immunity, previously won by Brian at the duel challenge, and would need to attend a special tribal council in which only the three of them could not vote and were only ones who could be voted for. The South team, who had lost the immunity and duel challenge, were granted safety.

 Despite losing the duel, Jesper was allowed to remain in the competition as Tina voluntarily left the competition following the duel.

 As reward for winning the team duel against the three members of the North team, the South team representatives, Endri, Isabella and Nicolai were told they would vote out one the three North team representatives, Bjørn, Pernille or Thomas.

 Following his win at the duel against Endri, Jesper volunteered to leave the game in Endri's place. Endri's team was then given the immunity initially won by Jesper.

 For winning the immunity challenge in episode 7 Bjørn was rewarded with two votes at North team's next tribal council.

 Due to the tie at tribal council Flemming and Marlene were forced to take part in a duel to determine who would be eliminated. As Marlene lost the duel she was to be the one eliminated from the game, however Pernille volunteered to leave in her place.

 For winning the immunity challenge in episode 8 Flemming was rewarded with two votes at North team's next tribal council. South team was also allowed to cast a vote for winning the duel.

 As they lost the duel (Sofie) and immunity challenge (Anne and Mads) Anne, Mads and Sofie each received an automatic vote at tribal council in episode 9.

 As they lost the duel (Mads) and immunity challenge (Sofie) Mads and Sofie each received an automatic vote at tribal council in episode 10.

 As they lost the duel (Nicolai) and immunity challenge (Hentze) Nicolai and Hentze each received an automatic vote at tribal council in episode 11.

 As she lost the immunity challenge Isabella received an automatic vote at tribal council in episode 12.

 As reward for winning plank at the start of the final Marlene was automatically given a spot in the final challenge and immunity from the last two elimination challenges.

 As she received the most jury votes to proceed to the final challenge of Bjørn, Isabella and Mads, Isabella was granted the second spot in the final challenge and did not have to take part in the final elimination.

External links

Robinson Ekspeditionen seasons
2017 Danish television seasons
Danish reality television series